

Results

Delegates

References 

Miss Nicaragua
2020 in Nicaragua
2020 beauty pageants